Apilocrocis albicupralis is a moth in the family Crambidae. It was described by George Hampson in 1918. It is found in Peru.

The wingspan is about 30 mm. The forewings are red brown with a cupreous gloss. There is a small white mark at the base and subbasal white spots on the costa and in the cell. There is a white patch on the basal part of the inner margin. There is a terminal series of minute triangular white spots. The hindwings are white, the veins slightly striated with brown and there is some reddish-brown suffusion beyond the lower angle of the cell and on the inner margin before the almost straight reddish-brown postmedial line. The terminal area is pale reddish brown with a cupreous gloss.

References

Moths described in 1918
Spilomelinae
Moths of South America